Puerto de las Nieves is a fishing village on the north-western coast of Gran Canaria, and the port of the town Agaete at a few kilometres' distance.

Ferries leave five times a day  for Santa Cruz de Tenerife. The crossing takes 80 minutes with catamarans.

Gallery

Populated places in Gran Canaria
Transport in the Canary Islands
Transport in Gran Canaria